Leuconitocris chrysostigma is a species of beetle in the family Cerambycidae. It was described by Harold in 1878, originally under the genus Nitocris. It contains the varietas Leuconitocris chrysostigma var. rufiniventris.

References

Leuconitocris
Beetles described in 1878